The Code of Personal Status is a Kuwait legal code promulgated in 1984. It is similar to the Code of Personal Status in Tunisia.

References

1984 in Kuwait